Livid is a medium bluish-gray color. This color name comes from the Latin color term lividus meaning "'a dull leaden-blue color', and also used to describe the color of contused flesh, leading to the English expression 'black and blue'". The first recorded use of livid as a color name in English was in 1622.

There is a range of colors called livid colors that combine the colors blue and gray. Some of these colors are shown below.

Livid (blue-gray) is the opposite concept from brown. Brown colors are mainly dark orange and dark red colors—warm colors on the warm color side of the color wheel, while blue-gray (livid) colors are mainly dark blue and dark azure colors—colors on the opposite side of the color wheel—cool colors on the cool color side of the color wheel.

Alternate names are blue-gray (American English) or blue-grey (British English), which was a name introduced by Crayola for a crayon color used from 1958 to 1990. Thus, the normalized color coordinates for livid and blue-gray are identical.

Variations of blue-gray
The colors below are arranged according to value (brightness) (the v code in hsv), lightest at the top and darkest towards the bottom.

Iceberg

The color iceberg is displayed at right.

The first recorded use of iceberg as a color name in English was in 1921.

Slate blue

Displayed at right is the web color slate blue.

The first recorded use of slate blue as a color name in English was in 1796.

Blue bell

Blue bell is a shade of blue-gray. It is also a Crayola color. It represents the bluebell flower.

The first recorded use of bluebell as a color name in English was in 1920.

Glaucous

Glaucous is a shade of blue-gray found on the surfaces of some plants and animals.

The first recorded use of glaucous as a color name in English was in the year 1671.

Steel blue

Steel blue is a color that resembles blue steel.

The first recorded use of steel blue as a color name in English was in 1817.

Cadet grey

Cadet grey, shown at right, and cadet blue, are shades of color used in military uniforms.

The first recorded use of cadet grey as a color name in English was in 1912. Before 1912, the word cadet grey was used as a name for a type of military issue uniform.

Cool gray

Cool gray is a medium light color gray mixed with the color blue.

Another name for this color is gray-blue.

This color is a dull shade of blue-gray.

This color is identical with color sample #203 (identified as "gray blue") at the following website: https://web.archive.org/web/20170810183646/http://tx4.us/nbs/nbs-g.htm—The ISCC-NBS Dictionary of Colo(u)r Names (1955), a website for stamp collectors to evaluate the colors of their stamps.

Air Force blue

Air force blue is a grayish shade of blue or azure used by the RAF.

There are other tones of air force blue, such as the darker one used by the United States Air Force.

Shadow blue

The color shadow blue is displayed at right.  Shadow blue is a color formulated by Crayola in 1990 as one of the colors in its Silver Swirls specialty box of metallic colors.

Although this is supposed to be a metallic color, there is no mechanism for displaying metallic colors on a computer.

Dark blue-gray

The color dark blue-gray is displayed at right.

Roman silver

At right is displayed the color Roman silver.

Roman silver is one of the colors on the Resene Color List, a color list widely popular in Australia and New Zealand.

This color is supposed to be a metallic color; however, there is no mechanism for displaying metallic colors on a flat computer screen.

Rhythm

Displayed at right is the color rhythm.

Rhythm is one of the colors on the Resene Color List, a color list widely popular in Australia and New Zealand. The color "rhythm" was formulated in 2004.

Payne's gray

Payne's gray is a dark blue-gray color used in painting.

The first recorded use of Payne’s grey as a color name in English was in 1835.

Blue-gray in nature
Insects
 Calliphora livida
Arachnids
 Haplopelma lividum
Birds
 Blue-grey gnatcatcher
 Blue-grey tanager
Mammals
 Blue-gray mouse

Blue-gray in culture
Animal husbandry
 Blue Grey is a type of beef cattle popular in Scotland and the north of England.

Medicine/sociology
 Upper-class families who used silver eating utensils every day gradually ingested small pieces of silver into their bodies and eventually developed a mild form of a condition called argyria, in which the skin takes on a blue-gray color, thus becoming known as bluebloods.

Sports
 The Blue–Gray Football Classic was an annual American college football all-star game held in Alabama usually on Christmas Day.  It was begun in 1939 and held annually through 2001 at the Cramton Bowl in Montgomery, Alabama.  It pitted players from the former Confederacy against players from the northern and western states of the United States.

Transportation planning
 In the Muni Metro, San Francisco's light rail system, the K Ingleside line, which goes to the Ingleside neighborhood, is represented by the color blue-gray.

See also
 RAL 5008 Grey blue
 RAL 7031 Blue grey
 List of colors

References

Shades of blue
Shades of gray